Gâvres is a commune in the Morbihan department of Brittany in north-western France. French Navy Minister Hyde de Neuville chose this place as a military testing area in 1829 for heavy marine ordnance. The extensive experiments performed at sea have later provided part of the data upon which Hugoniot's theory is based.

Demographics
Inhabitants of Gâvres are called in French Gâvrais.

See also
Communes of the Morbihan department

References

External links

 Mayors of Morbihan Association 

Communes of Morbihan